Antonio Hernández Gallegos (June 4, 1912 − October 22, 1973) was a Mexican Roman Catholic bishop.

Ordained to the priesthood on April 11, 1936, Hernández Gallegos was named bishop of the Roman Catholic Diocese of Tabasco, Mexico in 1967 and died in 1973 while still in office.

References

1912 births
1973 deaths
People from Querétaro
Roman Catholic bishops of Tabasco
20th-century Roman Catholic bishops in Mexico